Ghost Brothers is an American television series about the paranormal that premiered on April 15, 2016 on Destination America, which is part of Discovery Communications. Produced by Pilgrim Media Group in association with Crybaby Media, the program follows ghost hunters Dalen Spratt, Juwan Mass, and Marcus Harvey as they investigate locations around the United States that are reported to be haunted. The team is officially led by Spratt, with Mass and Harvey providing assistance and technical support. Season 2 aired on March 10, 2017 on TLC.

On July 17, 2019, it was announced that a spin-off series titled, Ghost Brothers: Haunted Houseguests, would premiere on August 16, 2019 on Travel Channel.

Premise
Based out of their hometown of Atlanta, Georgia, the Ghost Brothers are an all African-American group of ghost hunters who investigate the most haunted locations in America in an attempt to prove that ghosts are real. Before every investigation, their tagline is, "It's time to pop the trunk on these ghosts!", meaning open the door to their SUV's trunk where all their ghost hunting equipment is located. They also like to say, "Let's go ghosting!", and sing, "Ghost Brothers, ghosting out." when they roll out after their investigation is finished.

Opening Introduction:

Cast and crew
 Dalen Spratt – Leader, paranormal investigator, fashion designer 
 Juwan Mass – paranormal investigator, fashion designer
 Marcus Harvey – paranormal investigator, full-time barber

Series overview

Specials

Note: * These Ghostin' Edition specials re-aired on TLC after the first-run season 2 episodes.

Episodes

Season 1 (2016)

Season 2 (2017)

Spin-off

On July 17, 2019, it was announced that a spin-off series titled, Ghost Brothers: Haunted Houseguests, would premiere on August 16, 2019 on Travel Channel.

Reception
On IMDb, Ghost Brothers has a 'weighted average' vote of 6.3/10.

References

External links
 on Destination America

2016 American television series debuts
2017 American television series endings
2010s American documentary television series
Paranormal reality television series
English-language television shows
Destination America original programming
TLC (TV network) original programming